myDriver is an international chauffeur company that operates in more than 150 cities in 60 countries. Its services includes business rides at budget prices. mydriver is a subsidiary company from Sixt Rent A Car and is part of the new Business Unit Sixt Chauffeured Services. The company is completely owned and funded by Sixt.

History

Origins
mydriver was founded in 2013 in Berlin, Germany. It began offering an alternative taxi service which incorporates some of the luxury aspects of a chauffeur service while remaining price competitive with regular taxis. The creation of the mydriver brand was mainly pushed by the growing demand for limousine services and the expansion of the Sixt transportation services. mydriver was founded by Carl Schuster, Andreas Goschler and Oliver Mickler as a new venture of Sixt. mydriver launched its service at the beginning of 2013 in large German cities: Munich, Düsseldorf, Frankfurt, Berlin, Hamburg, Hannover, Cologne, Leipzig, Bremen, Stuttgart, Nuremberg and Dresden and offers airport transfers, chauffeur services, exhibition transfers, limousine services and private car services.

2014
In 2014 mydriver continued expansion throughout Germany and started testing international expansion with test cities in Paris, and Vienna.

2015
In the end of 2015 mydriver launched internationally in France, Austria and the Netherlands and became bookable Germany-wide.

2016
mydriver has continued international expansion in Europe in 2016 launching in these countries Spain, United Kingdom, Belgium, Italy, Monaco, Romania, Czech Republic and Turkey. The biggest development for the company was the expansion in the United States. mydriver was launched in various cities all over the US.

2017
In 2017 mydriver, the Sixt Chauffeur Service and Sixt rides joined together to operate under the product Sixt Chauffeured Services bookable on the Sixt website. In the booking process the customer can choose between different prices, car classes and services (e.g. business rides, high-class limousine service or shared rides) and gets a quick overview of the different options. mydriver focuses on business transfers offering corporate rates but also on private transfers.

Services
mydriver offers both corporate and private transfers, providing services by four different car segments: First class (e.g. Mercedes-Benz S-Class, BMW 7 series, Jaguar XJ), Business class (e.g. Mercedes-Benz E-Class, BMW 5 series, Jaguar XF), Economy class (e.g. Volkswagen Passat), VAN (e.g. Mercedes-Benz V-Class). Customers book trip via the platform, hotline or application for Apple and Android smartphones at least 60 minutes before the service starts. mydriver not only operates with own drivers but cooperates with 1500 external partners to make the service available in as many regions as possible.

Corporate affairs
mydriver was created as an alternative to conventional taxis, with a founding vision to create low-cost limousine service. With the merging of mydriver, the Sixt Chauffeur Service and Sixt rides into Sixt Chauffeured Services, mydriver’s goal is to offer affordable chauffeur services for business trips and private transfers for taxi-level prices around the world.

mydriver is headquartered in Berlin with more than 100 employees.

References

Further reading
 
 
 
"Fahrdienste locken mit Niedrigpreisen und gehobenem Service". Der Tagesspiegel.

External links

Companies based in Berlin
Transport companies established in 2012
Multinational companies headquartered in Germany
Ridesharing companies of Germany

de:Sixt SE#myDriver